Yewddys Bolivar Pérez Ventura (born February 21, 1984) is a male volleyball and beach volleyball player from Dominican Republic, who participated in the men's beach team competition at the 2006 Central American and Caribbean Games in Cartagena, Colombia, partnering Francisco Abreu.(Panamerican Game in Rio Janeiro Brazil 2007 - Partnering Alejandro Salas ) . 
Central Amecan and Caribbean Game Mayaguez Puerto Rico 2010 - Partnering (German Recio).
Panamerican Game - Veracruz Mexico 2011 . Partnering (German Recio )
He represented his native country at the 2006 NORCECA Men’s Beach Volleyball Continental Championship with Charlin Vargas.

He also competed at the 2007 NORCECA Beach Volleyball Circuit with Juan Antonio Pozo; in 2008 with Francisco Abreu and Charlin Vargas; and 2009 with Germán Recio.

At the Dominican Beach Tour 2008, he won two silver medals, playing with Dagonin Contreras.

At indoor volleyball, he earned two second places with Bahoruco at the Dominican Republic Volleyball League.

Clubs
  Tamayo-Bahoruco (2002–2011)

References

External links
 
 FEDOVOLI

Living people
Dominican Republic men's volleyball players
Dominican Republic beach volleyball players
Men's beach volleyball players
Beach volleyball players at the 2011 Pan American Games
Pan American Games competitors for the Dominican Republic
1984 births